Thomas Kelway (c. 1695 - 1744) was an English organist and composer.

Career
He became a chorister in the choir of Chichester Cathedral in 1704 and studied the organ with John Reading and Samuel Peirson. He succeeded Peirson as Organist of Chichester Cathedral in 1720 - however he was placed under probation for a period of 13 years before he was confirmed in the office. Kelway died in office, and left numerous compositions; his service in B minor remains a part of the choir's repertoire. During his tenure at the cathedral, John Byfield added the second manual (choir organ).

Compositions
Magnificat & Nunc Dimittis in B minor
Magnificat & Nunc Dimittis in G minor

Personal life
Kelway was born in Chichester in c. 1695. His father was a lay vicar at Chichester Cathedral, and his brother Joseph Kelway was Organist of St Michael, Cornhill (1734-1736) and St Martin-in-the-Fields (1736-1781).

See also
Organs and organists of Chichester Cathedral

References

External links
ChoralWiki profile of Thomas Kelway

1690s births
1744 deaths
English classical organists
British male organists
Cathedral organists
People from Chichester
Male classical organists